Daroji is a village in the southern state of Karnataka, India. It is located in the Sandur taluk of Bellary district in Karnataka.

Daroji is a village which has many tourist destinations, such as Beautiful Lake, Shree Veerabhadreshwara SwamyTemple on the hill, Jumbugan Park and Inspection Bungalow.
Its main tourist attraction is Daroji bear sanctuary.

Some kannada movies were shot in Daroji, including Male banthu Male and Manasa Sarovara.

Demographic
 India census, Daroji had a population of 8861 with 4450 males and 4411 females.

See also
 Bellary
 Districts of Karnataka

References

External links
 http://Bellary.nic.in/

Villages in Bellary district